Malin Maria Åkerman (born 12 May 1978) is a Swedish and American actress. In the early 2000s, she had several small television and film parts in both Canadian and American productions, including The Utopian Society (2003) and Harold & Kumar Go to White Castle (2004). Following a supporting role on the HBO mockumentary sitcom The Comeback (2005), she gained her first co-starring roles in the romantic comedy films The Heartbreak Kid (2007) and 27 Dresses (2008). She had an uncredited role in the science fiction film, The Invasion (2007). She played the female lead in Watchmen (2009) as Silk Spectre II, a role for which she was nominated for a Saturn Award for Best Supporting Actress.

In 2009, Åkerman had supporting and starring roles in the romantic comedies The Proposal and Couples Retreat. From 2010 to 2016, she starred on the Adult Swim comedy series Childrens Hospital. In 2012, she co-starred in the comedy Wanderlust and the musical film Rock of Ages. She had her first lead television role with the short-lived ABC comedy series Trophy Wife (2013–2014). She later co-starred in the film I'll See You in My Dreams (2015) and the action film Rampage (2018). Since 2016, Åkerman has had a main role on the Showtime drama series Billions as Lara Axelrod.

Apart from acting and modelling, Åkerman had a brief music career as the lead vocalist for alternative rock band The Petalstones in the early 2000s, but eventually left to focus on her acting career. She has been married twice, first from 2007 to 2014 to Petalstones drummer Roberto Zincone, with whom she has a son, and, since 2018, to English actor Jack Donnelly.

Early life
Åkerman was born in Stockholm on 12 May 1978, the daughter of aerobics teacher and part-time model Pia (née Sundström) and insurance broker Magnus Åkerman. When she was two years old, the family moved to Canada after her father was offered a job there. Four years later her parents divorced and her father moved back to Sweden. She was raised as a Buddhist. After her mother remarried, they moved to Niagara-on-the-Lake, Ontario. Her mother divorced again in Åkerman's teenage years. Åkerman attended many different schools, including Sir Winston Churchill Secondary School in St. Catharines, Ontario. She visited her father in Falsterbo during school breaks and talked to him regularly over the phone. She cites her parents as "supportive, positive influences" in her life.

Åkerman's mother introduced her to modelling while she was still in primary school. At age 16, she was discovered by Ford Models in a shopping mall in St. Catharines. She was signed to the agency and later won a contract with skincare company Noxzema. She soon moved to Toronto while attending North Toronto Collegiate Institute and later Dante Alighieri Academy. At the age of 18, inspired by the "helplessness" she sometimes felt during her childhood, she decided to become a child psychologist. She supported her education by modelling for television commercials and catalogue layouts. While studying for a year at York University in Toronto, she was simultaneously offered guest roles on television as a result of her exposure in commercials. She saw the acting roles as further opportunities to pay for her education but found herself enjoying acting, and later dropped out of school to become an actress. She moved to Los Angeles in 2001 to pursue her acting career full-time.

Career

Early roles (1997–2008)
Åkerman made her acting debut on the Canadian science fiction series Earth: Final Conflict in 1997 in a smaller role as a robot. She originally landed a role on an MTV pilot with Rachel McAdams but the project was never picked up by the network. In 2000 she guest starred on Relic Hunter and had a smaller role in the American film The Skulls. The following year she made appearances on the series Doc, Twice in a Lifetime and Witchblade. In 2001 she moved to Los Angeles, California, in hopes of pursuing a broader acting career. At first, she worked as a waitress and stayed at a friend's house. In 2002 she received a role in the film The Utopian Society. The film was edited by Francesco Sondelli, guitarist for alternative rock band Ozono. Sondelli asked Åkerman to help the band with song lyrics and later asked her to sing. Åkerman subsequently became the band's singer, and they changed their name to The Petalstones. The band's debut album Stung was released in August 2005, but Åkerman eventually left to focus on her acting career. She described her singing as "sort of a self-made, self-taught, if-you-can't-hit-the-note-scream-it kind of thing".

In 2004 she got a small role in the film Harold & Kumar Go to White Castle, but considered moving back to Canada as most of her auditions failed. She was then cast in a supporting role as Juna on the HBO television series The Comeback, with Lisa Kudrow in the main role. Kudrow played a former sitcom star who tried to restart her career. Åkerman's appearance on the show garnered media attention and resulted in her being offered more roles. A year later, she guest starred on an episode of Love Monkey and two episodes of Entourage. Before the Entourage episodes aired, she landed a role in the 2007 comedy film The Brothers Solomon. The film was a box office bomb and received largely critical reviews.

Åkerman signed up for a role opposite Ben Stiller in the comedy film The Heartbreak Kid, directed by the Farrelly Brothers, in 2006. She played Lila, the newly wedded wife of Stiller's character. The film follows the couple's honeymoon in Mexico, where Stiller's character falls in love with another woman and realizes that the marriage was a mistake. A remake of the 1972 film of the same title, it was released in October 2007 to generally poor reviews, as critics deemed it "neither as daring nor as funny" as the directors' earlier films. Åkerman's performance garnered more positive reviews; Desson Thomson of The Washington Post called her a "fabulous comic partner" to Stiller, while Roger Moore of Times Herald-Record asserted that she had outperformed him. The film grossed US$14 million in its opening weekend in the United States, and went on to gross US$127 million globally.

In 2007, Åkerman joined the cast of 27 Dresses, a romantic comedy film directed by Anne Fletcher with Katherine Heigl in the lead role. The film follows Heigl's character Jane, who has always been the bridesmaid and dreams of her own wedding. Åkerman played Jane's sister Tess. The film was shot during the summer of 2007, and was released in January 2008 to weak critical reception as it was considered "clichéd and mostly forgettable". The film was more successful commercially, with a gross of US$160 million. Åkerman played the title role in Bye Bye Sally, a short film directed by Paul Leyden and based on Lisa Mannetti's short story Everybody Wins. The film premiered at the 2009 Newport Beach Film Festival.

Breakthrough with Watchmen (2009–2011)

In 2009, Åkerman starred as Silk Spectre II in the superhero film Watchmen, an adaptation of Alan Moore's graphic novel of the same name. Directed by Zack Snyder, the feature film is set in an alternate reality in 1985 where a group of retired vigilantes investigate an apparent conspiracy against them. Snyder favoured Åkerman over other more well-known actresses as he felt that they could not play such a serious part. Åkerman rehearsed with "months of hardcore training" and went on a very strict diet. She wore a brunette wig, high heels and an uncomfortable latex costume, which provided little protection when performing stunts, and she often bruised herself during filming. Åkerman stated that her character carries the emotion of the film as she is the only woman among several men. Premiering in February 2009, the film received generally favourable reviews, and was a commercial success, grossing US$185 million worldwide. Although Åkerman was nominated for a Saturn Award for Best Supporting Actress for her performance in the film, critics were generally negative towards her acting. She also received nominations for a Teen Choice Award and two Scream Awards.

Åkerman appeared in the 2009 romantic comedy film The Proposal, starring Sandra Bullock and Ryan Reynolds in the lead roles. Åkerman played a supporting role as Gertrude, the ex-girlfriend of Reynolds' character. Although the film received mixed reviews, it went on to gross US$317 million worldwide. Also in 2009, Åkerman starred in the comedy film Couples Retreat, opposite Jon Favreau and Vince Vaughn. The film follows four couples as they travel to a tropical island resort for couples therapy. Åkerman played Ronnie, the wife of Vaughn's character. She enjoyed playing a mother for the first time and tried to make her character as truthful as possible. The film premiered in theatres in October 2009 and grossed US$34 million in its opening weekend in the United States, entering number one at the box office, and totalled US$171 million worldwide. Reception for the film was mainly negative, although Åkerman's performance was met with more positive reactions.

In 2010, Åkerman co-starred as Annie in the Josh Radnor-directed comedy-drama film Happy. Thank You. More. Please. As her character has alopecia, Åkerman shaved off her eyebrows and wore a bald cap to cover her hair. She was originally offered a different part, but felt that she wanted to play Annie as it was different from her previous roles. The film premiered at the Sundance Film Festival in January 2010 and received an audience award for Favorite U.S. Drama. Reviews from critics were polarized, but Åkerman received praise. Later in 2010, she guest starred on the How I Met Your Mother episode "The Wedding Bride", and joined the cast of the Adult Swim comedy series Childrens Hospital. Playing the part of the promiscuous Dr. Valerie Flame, Åkerman joined during the series' second season along with Henry Winkler. The series was originally a web series and Åkerman accepted the role after viewing several webisodes. "It was totally up my alley, my kind of humor", she said of the series. The same year, she played a supporting role in the romantic comedy film The Romantics with Katie Holmes, Josh Duhamel and Anna Paquin. The film premiered in September 2010 on limited release to generally negative reviews.

In 2010, she starred in Sebastian Gutierrez's comedy film Elektra Luxx opposite Carla Gugino and Joseph Gordon-Levitt. The film is a sequel to 2009's Women in Trouble. Åkerman played Trixie, an awkward drug store clerk who falls for Gordon-Levitt's character, who in turn is obsessed with Gugino's character, a retired porn star. Åkerman was offered the role during a screening of Women in Trouble. The film premiered in March 2011 on limited release and received generally unfavourable reviews; critics dismissed its many subplots and called it a "bizarre sex comedy". Next, Åkerman starred in the lead female role in the film The Bang Bang Club, which follows a group of young photojournalists in South Africa during the final stages of the apartheid. Åkerman played Robin Comley, a newspaper photo editor. The film premiered during the 2010 Toronto International Film Festival to mixed reviews from the press. In 2010, Åkerman signed up for a part in newcomer Aaron Harvey's Catch .44, a drama-thriller film with Forest Whitaker and Bruce Willis in the male lead roles. The film was generally ignored by critics and movie goers alike.

Further film and television work (2012–2014)
Åkerman had a supporting role in the 2012 comedy film Wanderlust, with Jennifer Aniston and Paul Rudd. The film focuses on an overworked couple who end up at a commune when they try to slow things down. Åkerman played Eva, a woman at the commune. The film received mixed to positive reviews from critics, who were divided regarding its humour, but ultimately praised the cast. Wanderlust underperformed at the box office, earning just over US$20 million worldwide during its theatrical run. Åkerman appeared in the comedy film The Giant Mechanical Man, which premiered at the Tribeca Film Festival in April 2012 to average reviews. She had a supporting role in the 2012 rock musical film Rock of Ages, based on the stage production of the same name. She played Constance Sack, a journalist who interviews Tom Cruise's character Stacee Jaxx. She hired a vocal coach as her role required her to sing; she and Cruise recorded a duet of Foreigner's "I Want to Know What Love Is" (1984). The duet appears on the soundtrack, which peaked at number five on the Billboard 200 and sold 320,000 copies in the US. Although the film grossed lower than expected, its opening weekend gross in the United States became the third-highest ever for an adaption of a stage production.

Åkerman played opposite Nicolas Cage in the 2012 bank heist action film Stolen. The film received negative reviews from critics and bombed at the box office. Next, Åkerman appeared in the crime film Hotel Noir (2012), the comedy horror film Cottage Country (2013), and the action thriller The Numbers Station (2013), all of which were panned by critics. In 2013, Åkerman portrayed Debbie Harry in Randall Miller's film CBGB. The film received a limited theatrical release and was met with negative reviews in the press. During this time, she had several guest roles on television, including the series Newsreaders, Robot Chicken, and Welcome to Sweden. From 2012 to 2013, she had a recurring role on ABC's comedy series Suburgatory as Alex, the absent mother of the main character Tessa. Åkerman was also a contestant on the comedy series Burning Love (2012), which parodied the reality series The Bachelor.

From 2013 to 2014, Åkerman held the lead role on the ABC sitcom Trophy Wife. She played Kate Harrison, the third wife of Bradley Whitford's character. Marcia Gay Harden and Michaela Watkins co-starred as Whitford's two ex-wives. Åkerman also served as a producer. She was initially put off by the title, "I saw the title and I said, 'Hell no, I'm not playing a trophy wife!'" However, she changed her mind after reading the script; she liked the writing and how the character is not actually a trophy wife. Executive producer Lee Eisenberg said the title was "always meant to be ironic". The series received positive reviews from critics, who praised the chemistry between the actors. Åkerman received critical acclaim for her performance; Gabriel Mizrahi of The Huffington Post deemed her portrayal "terrific", and Matt Webb Mitovich of TVLine opined that she "no less than shines here, coming off as fun-loving but not flaky, warm and not overheated". Several television critics named it one of the best new sitcoms of 2013, and some criticized its title for confusing audiences by suggesting it is about something that it is not. Willa Paskin of Slate regarded the title "terrible" and "an insult to its lovely, daffy main character". Criticism was also directed towards ABC for giving the series a poor time slot. Trophy Wife aired for one season before its cancellation.

Recent work (2015–present)
Åkerman was a main cast member on Yahoo! Screen's short-lived comedy series Sin City Saints (2015), which ran for an eight-episode season. She portrayed Dusty Halford, the lawyer of the eponymous basketball team. Åkerman co-starred in Brett Haley's comedy-drama film I'll See You in My Dreams (2015) with Blythe Danner. The film premiered at the 2015 Sundance Film Festival to positive reviews. Also in 2015, she starred in the comedy slasher film The Final Girls with Taissa Farmiga. The film follows a group of high school students who are transported into a slasher film. The film received generally favourable reviews from critics, who noted its "surprising layer of genuine emotion" amidst "the meta amusement". Åkerman was nominated for a Fangoria Chainsaw Award for Best Supporting Actress for her performance.

Åkerman acted in two feature films in 2016, Misconduct and The Ticket, both of which received limited release. Critical reception of Misconduct was generally negative, while The Ticket attracted mixed reviews. Åkerman's performance in the latter, as the wife of a blind man who regained his sight, was met with positive reception. The same year, Åkerman starred alongside Orlando Bloom and Kate Micucci on an episode of the Netflix comedy-drama series Easy, an anthology series with stand-alone episodes of different characters exploring relationships. Since 2016, Åkerman has been a main cast member on the Showtime drama series Billions, playing the role of Lara Axelrod, the wife of billionaire hedge fund manager Bobby Axelrod, portrayed by Damian Lewis. Åkerman enjoys playing the character due to her "no-nonsense" attitude. The series has received critical acclaim throughout its four seasons, and was renewed for a fifth season in May 2019. Åkerman stepped into a recurring role for the third season to accommodate for roles in other projects, which was written into the storyline of season 3 as her character becomes Bobby Axelrod's ex-wife, allowing her to step away from the show without angering the fans.

Åkerman was cast in Brad Peyton's science fiction monster film Rampage (2018), based on the video game series of the same name, as Claire Wyden, the CEO of a company responsible for the infection and mutation of several animals. She liked playing a villain for the first time as it was a "good challenge". She said, "I don't think she had any redeeming qualities, but I don't think characters have to have redeeming qualities. It's quite fun to just enjoy being evil". The film became a commercial success with a worldwide revenue of US$428 million, ending up as the twenty-first highest-grossing film of 2018. Critical reception was mixed, with some critics deeming it a "brainless blockbuster". In 2019, Åkerman made a guest appearance on the Comedy Central educational comedy series Drunk History where she played accused murderer Beulah Annan. Åkerman played the role of Grace Richmond, the mother of Liana Liberato's character, in Martha Stephens' coming-of-age drama To the Stars (2019). The film premiered at the 2019 Sundance Film Festival to positive reviews from critics.

Åkerman signed on for an NBC drama pilot titled Prism in February 2019. The pilot, directed by Daniel Barnz, details a murder trial told through different perspectives of each key person involved, with Åkerman as public defender Rachel Lewis. NBC passed on the project in May 2019. Åkerman played her first Swedish-speaking film role in the jukebox musical film En del av mitt hjärta, directed by Edward af Sillén and based on music by Swedish singer Tomas Ledin. The film received a Christmas 2019 release in Sweden. She also starred in The Sleepover, directed by Trish Sie for Netflix. Åkerman was cast in the comedy film Friendsgiving, directed by Nicol Paone in her directorial debut. Åkerman is also a producer on the project. She appeared in an episode of the AMC anthology series Soulmates, which premiered on 5 October 2020.

In 2020, Åkerman played the lead role of Ally in the CBS comedy pilot The Three of Us which was created by Frank Pines.

In 2023, Akerman competed in season nine of The Masked Singer as "Squirrel". While having bested Michael Bolton as "Wolf" and an as-yet-unrevealed contestant as "Gargoyle" (who was spared by Jenny McCarthy ringing the Ding Dong Keep It On Bell) on "DC Superheroes Night", she was eliminated on "Sesame Street Night" alongside Lele Pons as "Jackalope".

Personal life

Having been born in Sweden and raised in Canada, Åkerman has said that she has "conflicting feelings" for the two countries. In an interview for Toronto Star, she said, "Every time I'm in Canada I feel more Swedish, and every time I'm in Sweden I feel more Canadian. I belong in both places and I love them both equally." She is a Swedish citizen but not a Canadian one, instead having permanent residency in Canada. She became an American citizen in October 2018. Apart from speaking fluent English and Swedish, she also speaks French and Spanish.

Åkerman met Italian musician Roberto Zincone in 2003, when she was the lead singer for The Petalstones, for which he was the drummer. They usually socialized after band practice, using a dictionary as Zincone could not speak English. They eventually started dating and married in Sorrento in June 2007. In 2013, they had a son called Sebastian Zincone. The couple separated in November 2013, and Zincone filed for divorce later that month. In October 2017, Åkerman announced her engagement to English actor Jack Donnelly. They married in Tulum in December 2018.

Inspired by her Buddhist upbringing, Åkerman has a lotus flower tattoo on her upper back. She also has a tattooed "Z" on her right wrist, which she got to honor Zincone when they were married.

Åkerman has revealed that she is dyslexic and that it takes her "a long time" to learn her lines: "I get horrified when I have to do table reads with the whole cast, because there's a lot of stuttering coming from me, so I have to do a lot of prep." Because of this, she prefers to improvise her lines.

Public image
In 2008 she made her first appearance on AskMen.com's "99 Most Desirable Women" list at number 60. The same year men's magazine Maxim placed her at number 59 in their annual "Hot 100" rankings. The following year the magazine ranked her at number four.

In 2012 Åkerman travelled to Tanzania with Opportunity International and has since begun support of their international development work, becoming a Young Ambassador for Opportunity in June 2012, and hosting a fundraiser for Opportunity in October 2012. She served food with fellow actress January Jones at the Los Angeles Mission's annual Thanksgiving event in 2021.

Filmography

Film

Television

Awards and nominations

Notes

References

External links

 
 

1978 births
Living people
Actresses from Stockholm
Actresses from Toronto
American Buddhists
American film actresses
American television actresses
Buddhist feminists
Naturalized citizens of the United States
Swedish Buddhists
Swedish emigrants to Canada
Swedish emigrants to the United States
Swedish film actresses
Swedish television actresses
20th-century American actresses
21st-century American actresses
20th-century Swedish actresses
21st-century Swedish actresses
American people of Canadian descent
American people of Swedish descent
Actors with dyslexia